Platava is a rural locality (a selo) and the administrative center of Platavskoye Rural Settlement, Repyovsky District, Voronezh Oblast, Russia. The population was 972 as of 2010. There are 10 streets.

Geography 
Platava is located 36 km northeast of Repyovka (the district's administrative centre) by road. Rossoshki is the nearest rural locality.

References 

Rural localities in Repyovsky District